William Lee Jennings (September 28, 1925 – October 20, 2010) was a shortstop in Major League Baseball. He studied business at Washington University.

A native of St. Louis, Missouri, Jennings played briefly for the St. Louis Browns during the  season. He was signed by the New York Giants in 1946 and immediately was assigned to their Minor league system. He then was purchased by the Browns from the Giants in 1951.

Jennings posted a .179 average (35-for-195) in 64 games for the Browns, driving in 13 runs and scoring 20 times, while collecting 10 doubles, two triples, and one stolen base. He also played for the Cleveland Indians and Chicago White Sox organizations, hitting a collective .255 with 68 home runs and 314 RBI in 897 minor league games from 1946 to 1953.

Jennings died in his hometown of St. Louis, Missouri, at the age of 85.

Sources

Major League Baseball shortstops
St. Louis Browns players
Jersey City Giants players
Minneapolis Millers (baseball) players
San Diego Padres (minor league) players
Toronto Maple Leafs (International League) players
Trenton Giants players
Washington University Bears baseball players
Baseball players from St. Louis
1925 births
2010 deaths